Maria Pia Di Meo (born Maria Pia Tempestini, 23 September 1939) is an Italian actress and voice actress, best known for being the official voice dubber of Meryl Streep.

Biography
The daughter of actors Giotto Tempestini and Anna Di Meo, she began her voice actress career in 1944, when she was very young, and occasionally acted on stage together with her parents.

Among the several actresses she dubbed, there are Meryl Streep, Jane Fonda, Audrey Hepburn, Julie Andrews, Julie Christie and Shirley MacLaine. Di Meo has also been very active in dubbing many animated characters, including Princess Aurora in Sleeping Beauty and Anita in One Hundred and One Dalmatians.

Dubbing roles

Animation
Princess Aurora in Sleeping Beauty
Anita Radcliffe in One Hundred and One Dalmatians
Mrs. Fox in Fantastic Mr. Fox
Littlefoot's mother in The Land Before Time
Queen Lilian in Shrek 2
Queen Lilian in Shrek the Third
Queen Lilian in Shrek Forever After
Miss Kitty in An American Tail: Fievel Goes West
Madame Suliman in Howl's Moving Castle
Gothel in Barbie as Rapunzel
Shuriki in Elena and the Secret of Avalor
The Queen in Maya the Bee
The Queen in Maya the Bee: The Honey Games
Madame in Kiki's Delivery Service
Boy #1 in ChalkZone

Live action

Linda in The Deer Hunter
Joanna Kramer in Kramer vs. Kramer
Karen Blixen in Out of Africa
Karen Silkwood in Silkwood
Molly Gilmore in Falling in Love
Madeline Ashton in Death Becomes Her
Lee Wakefield Lacker in Marvin's Room
Mary Fisher in She-Devil
Susan Traherne in Plenty
Suzanne Vale in Postcards from the Edge
Francesca Johnson in The Bridges of Madison County
Roberta Guaspari in Music of the Heart
Blue Fairy in A.I. Artificial Intelligence
Clarissa Vaughan in The Hours
Susan Orlean in Adaptation
Josephine Anwhistle in Lemony Snicket's A Series of Unfortunate Events
Yolanda Johnson in A Prairie Home Companion
Miranda Priestly in The Devil Wears Prada
Janine Roth in Lions for Lambs
Sister Aloysius Beauvier in Doubt
Julia Child in Julie & Julia
Margaret Thatcher in The Iron Lady
Violet Weston in August: Osage County
The Chief Elder in The Giver
The Witch in Into the Woods
Emmeline Pankhurst in Suffragette
Florence Foster Jenkins in Florence Foster Jenkins
Katharine Graham in The Post
Aunt March in Little Women
Sissi in Sissi – Fateful Years of an Empress
Annemarie von Hartman in The Cardinal
Janet Lagerlof in Good Neighbor Sam
Marianne in The Swimming Pool
Elisabeth of Austria in Ludwig
Roberte Groult in Love at the Top
Nadine Chevalier in That Most Important Thing: Love
Margot Santorini in A Woman at Her Window
Chantal Martinaud in The Inquisitor
Katherine Mortenhoe in Death Watch
Corie Bratter in Barefoot in the Park
Barbarella in Barbarella
Cat Ballou in Cat Ballou
Ella Connors in Comes a Horseman
Sally Hyde in Coming Home
Kimberly Wells in The China Syndrome
Hallie Martin in The Electric Horseman
Martha Livingston in Agnes of God
Brenda Morel in Youth
Teddy Stanton in Fathers and Daughters
Addie Moore in Our Souls at Night
Fanny Brice in Funny Girl
Fanny Brice in Funny Lady
 Dolly Levi in Hello, Dolly!
Judy Maxwell in What's Up, Doc?
Katie Morosky in The Way We Were
Esther Hoffman Howard in A Star Is Born
Yentl Mendel / Anshel Mendel in Yentl
Susan Lowenstein in The Prince of Tides
Rose Morgan in The Mirror Has Two Faces
Roz Focker in Meet the Fockers
Roz Focker in Little Fockers
Princess Aouda in Around the World in 80 Days
Fran Kubelik in The Apartment
Irma la Douce in Irma la Douce
Charity Hope Valentine in Sweet Charity
Eve Rand in Being There
Madame Yuvline Sousatzka in Madame Sousatzka
Louisa "Ouiser" Boudreaux in Steel Magnolias
Pearl Berman in Used People
Tess Carlisle in Guarding Tess
Ella Hirsch in In Her Shoes
Coco Chanel in Coco Chanel
Natasha Rostova in War and Peace
Jo Stockton in Funny Face
Sister Luke in The Nun's Story
Holly Golightly in Breakfast at Tiffany's
Regina Lampert in Charade
Eliza Doolittle in My Fair Lady
Nicole Bonnet in How to Steal a Million
Joanna Wallace in Two for the Road
Hap in Always
Samoa in Samoa, Queen of the Jungle
Cora in Le Mans, Shortcut to Hell
Floriana in Your Vice Is a Locked Room and Only I Have the Key
Luisa De Dominicis in The School Teacher in the House
Nicole Molineaux in Eighteen in the Sun
Francesca in Crazy Desire
Mimi in The Libertine
Cecilia in The Empty Canvas
Dora in The Girl from Parma
Anna Terzi in The Cat o' Nine Tails
Claire Wilson in Ripped Off
Mia in The Seventh Seal
Sara in Wild Strawberries
Hjördis Petterson in Brink of Life
Sara in The Magician
Britt-Marie in The Devil's Eye
Miss Bumblebee in All These Women
Alma in Persona
Mary Poppins in Mary Poppins
Maria von Trapp in The Sound of Music
Sarah Louise Sherman in Torn Curtain
Jerusha Bromley in Hawaii
Judith Farrow in The Tamarind Seed
Sally Miles in S.O.B.
Victoria Grant / Count Victor Grezhinski Victor/Victoria
Pamela Piquet in A Fine Romance
Marianna in The Man Who Loved Women
Julie Andrews in Unconditional Love
Lily in Tooth Fairy
Lara Antipova in Doctor Zhivago
Clarisse Linda Montag in Fahrenheit 451
Jackie Shawn in Shampoo
Betty Logan in Heaven Can Wait
Phyllis Mann in Afterglow
Fiona Anderson in Away from Her
Donatella in Donatella
Onahti in The Indian Fighter
Hilda in The Trial
Doriana in Wild Cats on the Beach
Elena in Rice Girl
Anna in Rampage
Patricia Franchini in Breathless
Cecile in Bonjour Tristesse
Giovanna in This Kind of Love
Tanya Livingston in Airport
Luisa in Gang War in Naples
Varinia in Spartacus
Elizabeth Rambeau in This Earth Is Mine
Mary Follett in All the Way Home
Molly Lang in Rough Night in Jericho
Caro Plantin in The Black Tulip
Mrs. Ford in How to Murder Your Wife
Luisa in The Dolls
Arabella in Arabella
Suzanna Moritz in The 25th Hour
Max in Mission: Impossible
Sonia Wick in Girl, Interrupted
Old Briony Tallis in Atonement
Merry Noel Blake in Rich and Famous
Judy Tobias in The In-Laws
Kate Hennings in Sweet Home Alabama
Kathleen Riley in Suspect
Margaret Connor in Faithful
Elsa Morganthal Strauss-Armistan in Tea with Mussolini
Consuelo / Altagracia Di Lorna in Musketeers of the Sea
Anna Curtis in The Angry Silence
Ildith in Sodom and Gomorrah
Rosa Delle Rose in The Rose Tattoo
Maria Montagne in The Man in the Gray Flannel Suit
Catherine de' Medici in Diane
Patrizia in Don't Torture a Duckling
Monica Brown in The Syndicate: A Death in the Family
Louise Pendrake in Little Big Man
Yolande of Aragon in The Messenger: The Story of Joan of Arc
Zhora Salome in Blade Runner
Dolores in Who Framed Roger Rabbit
Thetis in Clash of the Titans
Granny Wendy in Hook
 Mrs. Farraday in Mary Reilly
Alicia Clark in The Paper
Melanie Daniels in The Birds
Marnie Edgar in Marnie
Jill Bryant in The Year of Living Dangerously
Valeria in The Anonymous Venetian
Ronnie Neary in Close Encounters of the Third Kind
Carol in Once Upon a Time in America
Truly Scrumptious in Chitty Chitty Bang Bang
Carlotta in Two Weeks in Another Town
Connie Walsh in House of Sand and Fog
Melinda Moores in The Green Mile
Irene Walsh in The Goonies
Belinda Conine in Philadelphia
Lillian Thurman in Donnie Darko
Tina in Martian Child
Headmistress in Phenomena
Mrs. Gump in Forrest Gump
Holly Jones in Prisoners
Edwina Cutwater in All of Me
Principal McGee in Grease (2002 redub)
Dolores "Lolita" Haze in Lolita

References

External links

1939 births
Living people
Actresses from Rome
Italian voice actresses
Italian stage actresses
Italian film actresses
Italian television actresses
Italian child actresses
Italian voice directors
20th-century Italian actresses
21st-century Italian actresses